Podgorje ob Sevnični is a dispersed settlement in the hills north of Sevnica in east-central Slovenia. The area is part of the historical region of Styria. The Municipality of Sevnica is now included in the Lower Sava Statistical Region.

Name
The name of the settlement was changed from Podgorje to Podgorje ob Sevnični in 1953.

Church
The local church is dedicated to Our Lady of the Rosary and belongs to the Parish of Zabukovje. It has a Romanesque core and was restyled in the Baroque in the 17th century.

Notable people
Notable people that were born or lived in Zabukovje nad Sevnico include:
 (born 1956), carpentry engineer, businessman
Janez Zorko (born 1937), sculptor and mountain climber

References

External links
Podgorje ob Sevnični at Geopedia

Populated places in the Municipality of Sevnica